Dark Brown is a 1963 Australian TV play. It was based on a British play that had been filmed by the ABC in 1957.

It was the second live drama recorded at the ABC in Brisbane, after Vacancy in Vaughan Street. It was shot at the ABC's studios in Toowong. Australian drama was very rare at the time, and mostly made in Sydney and Melbourne.

Plot
In 1880, Jenny Brown worries about the trips her tobacconist husband Arthur is making to Eastborne to visit his ailing aunt. There are also a series of unsolved murders. The aunt, Mrs Persephelous, visits Jenny.

Cast
Barbara Wheelton as Jenny Brown
Ray Dunlop as Arthur Brown
Babette Stephens as Mrs Persephelous
Betty Ross as shop clerk Miss Tasker
Gwen Wheeler as Mrs Collins, Jenny's mother
Beverly Bates as cousin Bella
Glen Stirratt as Bella's finance Fred

Production
The sets were designed by Bernard Hides and Bill Collyer. They had to recreate the parlour at the back of Arthur's shop and decided to add the shop as well to give the set better dimensions and to open out the play from its stage origins. The tobacco used was made of peat moss.

The production was taped at the ABC studios in Toowong and that recording was broadcast. During the broadcast and cast re-enacted the play in the studio; they did this without the costumes or sets used during the taping, but just to improve.  "We are still inexperienced and we have to make every effort to improve," said Cubbage. Ray Menmuir, ABC director, was in Brisbane on 3 and 4 December to watch the taping and offer suggestions.

See also
Vacancy in Vaughan Street (1963)
Crisis (1963)
Dear Edgar (1964)
The Monkey Cage (1965)
The Quiet Season (1965)
Ring Out Wild Bells (1964)
The Absence of Mr Sugden (1965)
Arabesque for Atoms (1965)
A Sleep of Prisoners (1961)

References

External links
Dark Brown at IMDb

1963 television films
1963 films
Australian television films
1960s Australian television plays
Australian Broadcasting Corporation original programming
English-language television shows
Black-and-white Australian television shows